Southeast Christian Church is an Evangelical multi-site megachurch  of the Christian churches denomination based in Louisville, Kentucky. , it is the fourth-largest church in the United States.

On March 10, 2019, longtime Teaching Pastor, Kyle Idleman assumed senior leadership.

History
The church was established on July 1, 1962 as 53 members of the South Louisville Christian Church started a new church in the Hikes Point area. By 1998, the church had relocated to – and outgrown – numerous buildings until reaching its current location at 920 Blankenbaker Parkway in Louisville. Former Senior Minister Bob Russell retired in 2006 after 40 years of service.  He was succeeded as senior minister by Dave Stone, the longtime preaching associate at Southeast. The church is commonly known as "Six Flags over Jesus" to local residents, a satirical reference to the large size of the church building. 

In February 2007, Southeast Christian officially released an announcement that it would establish a satellite church in Clark County, Indiana. With the establishment of a second location, Southeast became a multi-site church.  The breaking of the ground, by I-65 Exit 4 in Jeffersonville, Indiana, took place on August 12, 2007, and the church officially opened on April 12, 2009. On February 8, 2009, the church announced the plans for its third location. The Oldham County Campus, in Crestwood, Kentucky, held its first service in January 2011. In 2009, Southeast also opened up a new youth building called "The Block". On the weekend of June 30/July 1, 2012, the church announced that it would develop a fourth campus in southwest Jefferson County, near Dixie Highway (US 31W) and adjacent to the southwestern campus of Christian Academy of Louisville. This site was originally expected to open in fall 2013, but groundbreaking was delayed until February 2013; the new campus opened in time for Easter 2014. The next satellite campus was found in an old movie theatre in LaGrange, Kentucky in January 2017, making this the 5th campus to launch. In 2017, a satellite campus opened in Elizabethtown, Kentucky. The church also opened a campus in  Prospect, Kentucky in 2019.

In September 2019, the church announced a campus in Shelby County, Kentucky would be built, and in January 2020, the church announced a campus in Bullitt County, Kentucky would be built. In May 2021, the South Louisville campus launched. 

The church holds several on-campus and online support groups, including Journey to Freedom, a group for women with unwanted same-sex attraction. Kentucky has no laws prohibiting conversion therapy.

See also
 Religion in Louisville, Kentucky

References

External links
 
 Southeast TV
 The Southeast Outlook, weekly newspaper published by Southeast Christian Church

Christian churches and churches of Christ
Churches in Louisville, Kentucky
Churches in Oldham County, Kentucky
Churches in Clark County, Indiana
Evangelical churches in Kentucky
Evangelical megachurches in the United States
Middletown, Kentucky
1962 establishments in Kentucky
Christian organizations established in 1962
Megachurches in Kentucky
Non-denominational Evangelical multisite churches